Mueang Na is a tambon (subdistrict) of Chiang Dao District, in Chiang Mai Province, Thailand. In 2020 it had a total population of 37,348 people.

Administration

Central administration
The tambon is subdivided into 14 administrative villages (muban).

Local administration
The whole area of the subdistrict is covered by the subdistrict municipality (Thesaban Tambon) Mueang Na (เทศบาลตำบลเมืองนะ).

References

External links
Thaitambon.com on Mueang Na

Tambon of Chiang Mai province
Populated places in Chiang Mai province